Adam Berry (born 1966) is an American television and film composer.

Adam Berry may also refer to:
 Adam Berry (cricketer) (born 1992), Irish cricketer
 Adam Berry (soccer) (born 1997), Australian soccer player